There are 62 named Ecological Systems found in Montana  These systems are described in the Montana Field Guides-Ecological Systems of Montana.

About 
An ecosystem is a biological environment consisting of all the organisms living in a particular area, as well as all the nonliving, physical components of the environment with which the organisms interact, such as air, soil, water and sunlight. It is all the organisms in a given area, along with the nonliving (abiotic) factors with which they interact; a biological community and its physical environment. As stated in an article from Montana State University in their Institute on Ecosystems; "An ecosystem can be small, such as the area under a pine tree or a single hot spring in Yellowstone National Park, or it can be large, such as the Rocky Mountains, the rainforest or the Antarctic Ocean." The Montana Fish, Wildlife and Parks (FWP) have shared their views on Montana's Main Ecosystems as montane forest, intermountain grasslands, plains grasslands and shrub grasslands.  The Montana Agricultural Experiment Station (MAES) categorized Montana's ecosystems based on the different rangelands. They have recognized 22 different ecosystems whereas the Montana Natural Heritage Program named 62 ecosystems for the entire state.

Forest and Woodland Systems
 Northern Rocky Mountain Mesic Montane Mixed Conifer Forest
 Rocky Mountain Subalpine Mesic Spruce-Fir Forest and Woodland
 Northwestern Great Plains - Black Hills Ponderosa Pine Woodland and Savanna
 Northern Rocky Mountain Dry-Mesic Montane Mixed Conifer Forest
 Rocky Mountain Foothill Limber Pine - Juniper Woodland
 Northern Rocky Mountain Foothill Conifer Wooded Steppe
 Rocky Mountain Lodgepole Pine Forest
 Middle Rocky Mountain Montane Douglas-Fir Forest and Woodland
 Northern Rocky Mountain Ponderosa Pine Woodland and Savanna
 Rocky Mountain Poor Site Lodgepole Pine Forest
 Rocky Mountain Subalpine Dry-Mesic Spruce-Fir Forest and Woodland
 Northern Rocky Mountain Subalpine Woodland and Parkland
 Rocky Mountain Aspen Forest and Woodland
 Western Great Plains Wooded Draw and Ravine
 Inter-Mountain Basins Mountain Mahogany Woodland and Shrubland
 Inter-Mountain Basins Aspen Mixed Conifer Forest-Woodland

Alpine Systems
 Rocky Mountain Alpine Dwarf-Shrubland
 Rocky Mountain Alpine Turf
 Rocky Mountain Alpine Bedrock and Scree
 Rocky Mountain Alpine Fell-Field
 North American Alpine Ice Field

Shrubland, Steppe and Savanna Systems
 Northwestern Great Plains Shrubland
 Rocky Mountain Lower Montane-Foothill Shrubland
 Northern Rocky Mountain Montane-Foothill Deciduous Shrubland
 Northern Rocky Mountain Subalpine Deciduous Shrubland
 Inter-Mountain Basins Big Sagebrush Steppe
 Inter-Mountain Basins Montane Sagebrush Steppe
 Inter-Mountain Basins Big Sagebrush Shrubland
 Wyoming Basins Dwarf Sagebrush Shrubland and Steppe
 Inter-Mountain Basins Mat Saltbush Shrubland
 Inter-Mountain Basins Mixed Salt Desert Scrub

Grassland Systems
 Northwestern Great Plains Mixedgrass Prairie
 Western Great Plains Sand Prairie
 Northern Rocky Mountain Lower Montane, Foothill and Valley Grassland
 Rocky Mountain Subalpine-Montane Mesic Meadow
 Northern Rocky Mountain Subalpine-Upper Montane Grassland

Sparse and Barren Systems
 Inter-Mountain Basins Active and Stabilized Dune
 Western Great Plains Badlands
 Inter-Mountain Basins Shale Badland
 Western Great Plains Cliff and Outcrop
 Rocky Mountain Cliff, Canyon and Massive Bedrock
 Inter-Mountain Basins Cliff and Canyon

Open Water/Wetland and Riparian Systems
 Rocky Mountain Subalpine-Montane Fen
 Western Great Plains Closed Depressional Wetland
 Western Great Plains Open Freshwater Depression Wetland
 Great Plains Prairie Pothole
 Western Great Plains Saline Depression Wetland
 Northern Rocky Mountain Wooded Vernal Pool
 Inter-Mountain Basins Greasewood Flat
 Northwestern Great Plains Floodplain
 Northwestern Great Plains Riparian
 Northern Rocky Mountain Lower Montane Riparian Woodland and Shrubland
 Rocky Mountain Lower Montane-Foothill Riparian Woodland and Shrubland
 Rocky Mountain Subalpine-Montane Riparian Shrubland
 Rocky Mountain Subalpine-Montane Riparian Woodland
 Northern Rocky Mountain Conifer Swamp
 North American Arid West
 Geysers and Hot Springs
 Open Water
 Rocky Mountain Alpine-Montane Wet Meadow

Further reading

See also
 Greater Yellowstone Ecosystem

Notes

Montana
Natural history of Montana